Domingo de Oña, O. de M. or Pedro de Oña (1560 – 13 October 1626) was a Roman Catholic prelate who served as Bishop of Gaeta (1605–1626) 
and Bishop of Coro (1601–1605).

Biography
Domingo de Oña was born in Burgos, Spain in 1560 and ordained a priest in the Order of the Blessed Virgin Mary of Mercy.
On 27 August 1601, he was appointed during the papacy of Pope Clement VIII as Bishop of Coro.
On 9 December 1601, he was consecrated bishop by Domenico Ginnasi, Archbishop of Manfredonia. 
On 27 June 1605, he was appointed during the papacy of Pope Paul V as Bishop of Gaeta.
He served as Bishop of Gaeta until his death on 13 October 1626.

Episcopal succession
While bishop, he was the principal co-consecrator of:

References

External links and additional sources
 (for Chronology of Bishops) 
 (for Chronology of Bishops) 
 (for Chronology of Bishops) 
 (for Chronology of Bishops) 

'

17th-century Roman Catholic bishops in Venezuela
Bishops appointed by Pope Clement VIII
Bishops appointed by Pope Paul V
1560 births
1626 deaths
Roman Catholic bishops of Coro